Pindad APR-1V, APR-1V, or simply APR-1, also known as APR1V1 (Angkut Personel Ringan; English: Light Personnel Carrier) is an armoured personnel carrier made by PT Pindad of Indonesia. This vehicle is the first production model in a series of Pindad's APC which began from a variant that uses 4x4 wheel drive and later developed into APS-1 and APS-2 with 6x4 wheels drive and then redeveloped into APS-3 Anoa with 6x6 drive.

Development 
The development history started as a result of increased military intervention in the Aceh province. During the military operations, the Indonesian Army put forward urgent requirements for an armoured personnel carrier for troop transport.

Pindad responded to this requirement in 2004, with the APR-1V (Angkut Personel Ringan) a light 4x4 armoured vehicle based on a commercial Isuzu truck chassis, 14 vehicles were built by Pindad and were sent to Aceh for evaluation and combat trials. However, the follow-on orders for another 26 vehicles were cancelled following the 2004 tsunami.
The development of the APC started when Pindad assembled the British-made Scorpion tank. After that, Pindad made a water cannon vehicle and a 4x4 light personnel carrier (APR1-V1) to be used by the TNI and Brimob.

In 2002, PT Pindad produced the 4×4 APR using Isuzu's frame and 120PS engine. This is continued in 2004–2005 by cooperating with BPPT to produce a 4×4 APS (Medium Personnel Carrier) prototype. The development was then continued by developing armoured vehicles whose components developed indigenously by making a prototype of 6×6 wheeled armoured vehicle using a Perkasa truck undercarriage, including a 220 PS engine and a transmission produced by PT Texmaco.

This prototype became the starting point for PT Pindad in developing a 6×6 armoured vehicle with a monocoque body, independent wheel drive and suspension system according to TNI specifications.

Gallery

See also 

 Panhard VBL
 Otokar Cobra

References 

Wheeled armoured personnel carriers
Wheeled armoured fighting vehicles
Wheeled military vehicles
Military vehicles introduced in the 2000s
Military vehicles of Indonesia